Bittenbinder, from bitten=cask + binder=binder, is a German occupational surname for a cooper. It may refer to the following notable people:

J. J. Bittenbinder (born 1943), American police officer and author
József Bittenbinder (1890–1963), Hungarian gymnast

See also
Bittenbender

References

German-language surnames
Occupational surnames